Koishikawa may refer to:

Places
Koishikawa, locality within Bunkyo, Tokyo.

People
Masahiro Koishikawa, noted Japanese astronomer.

Astronomy
6097 Koishikawa, Asteroid named after the astronomer

Fictional characters
Miki Koishikawa, Marmalade Boy character.
Jin Koishikawa, Marmalade Boy character.
Chiyako Koishikawa, Marmalade Boy character.